Peter Joseph Rajkovich (January 17, 1911 – November 13, 1979) was an American football fullback who played during the 1934 season for the Pittsburgh Pirates. 
Rajkovich ran for 140 yards in his career on 39 attempts, scoring 0 rushing touchdowns. He played college football for the University of Detroit Mercy.

References

Further reading

1911 births
1979 deaths
American football fullbacks
Detroit Titans football players
People from Tuscola County, Michigan
Pittsburgh Pirates (football) players
Players of American football from Michigan